Brandon McRae (born March 5, 1986) is a former American football wide receiver.

Early years
McRae played at  Monacan High School in Richmond, Va. He helped lead the Chiefs to a 9-1 record during his senior season. He also participated in track, as a sprinter. After high school McRae played at Hargrave Military Academy in Chatham, Va. He played defensive back at Hargrave  and ran a 4.51 40-yard dash at the Hargrave following the 2004 season and helped lead his prep school team to an 8-3 overall record.

College career
McRae attended Mississippi State University after beginning his collegiate career Morehead State University. In 2009, he recorded 14 receptions for 116 yards and suffered a broken leg that ended his senior season.  In 2008, he played in all 12 games during his junior season, starting 10 times and led the team with 51 catches for 518 yards, a 10.2-yard per catch average, and three touchdowns.  McRae played in all 13 games of his sophomore season, earning one starting call and made two catches for 50 yards on the season. In 2006, he sat out the season to establish his transfer eligibility.

In 2005 McRae led Morehead State University in receiving as a true freshman with 28 receptions for 361 yards, a 12.9-yard average, and one touchdown.

Professional career

St. Louis Rams
McRae signed with the Rams as an undrafted rookie free agent on April 25, 2010. He was waived and then signed to the Rams practice squad on September 4, 2010.

Virginia Destroyers
McRae was signed by the Virginia Destroyers of the United Football League on June 14, 2011.

References

External links
 Just Sports Stats
 Edmonton Eskimos bio
 Mississippi State bio

1986 births
Living people
American football wide receivers
Edmonton Elks players
Georgia Force players
Mississippi State Bulldogs football players
St. Louis Rams players
Players of American football from Boston
Virginia Destroyers players